"I Want a New Duck" is a song by "Weird Al" Yankovic.  It is a parody of "I Want a New Drug" by Huey Lewis and the News.

The lyrics note the traits that the singer wants in his new pet duck. Reasonable traits include not messing up his house or quacking all night, while bizarre ones include being able to wash his car and rescue him from drowning if need be.

Writing and recording
In order to educate himself on the nature of ducks, Yankovic went to the local library and "read up on ducks for a week."

Track listing
The following tracks are on the single:
 "I Want a New Duck" – 3:01
 "Cable TV" – 3:52

The promo single only contains "I Want a New Duck".

Popular culture
This song is heavily referenced in a Funny or Die skit featuring Huey Lewis and Yankovic, spoofing the movie American Psycho (2000). In the original movie, there is a scene in which Patrick Bateman (Christian Bale) gives a critique of the Huey Lewis and the News song "Hip to Be Square" to an intoxicated Paul Allen (Jared Leto), before he brutally murders him with an axe. In the Funny or Die parody, Lewis himself plays the part of Bateman, and Yankovic plays the part of Allen; however, instead of discussing "Hip to Be Square", Lewis discusses American Psycho itself. In the end, Lewis kills Yankovic with an axe before yelling: "Try parodying one of my songs now, you stupid bastard!"

The song was also featured in the 1987 Disney special Down and Out with Donald Duck, set to a montage of Donald's fall from stardom and in the closing credits.

See also
 List of singles by "Weird Al" Yankovic
 List of songs by "Weird Al" Yankovic

References

"Weird Al" Yankovic songs
1985 singles
Songs with lyrics by "Weird Al" Yankovic
Songs written by Huey Lewis
Songs written by Chris Hayes (musician)